Malik Shah, also known as Şâhinşah was the sultan of the Seljuk Sultanate of Rûm between the years 1110 and 1116.

Reign
Prior to Malik Shah's accession, the throne had remained vacant for three years following the death of Kilij Arslan I in 1107. Malik Shah was held prisoner in Isfahan until 1110 when he returned to Anatolia to assume the throne.  Shortly before his death he was defeated by the Byzantine emperor Alexios Komnenos at the Battle of Philomelion. Malik Shah then signed a treaty with the emperor, allegedly agreeing to let the Byzantines take back all their land in Anatolia, but the treaty was nullified after Malik Shah was deposed, blinded and eventually murdered by his brother Mesud, who succeeded him as sultan. The loss of prestige suffered by Malik Shah due to his defeat by the Byzantines probably precipitated his fall.

Malik Shah was described by Anna Komnena as a fool who often ignored the strategies of his more experienced generals, to the point where he mocked and criticized his generals.

References

Bibliography

Sultans of Rum
1116 deaths
Byzantine–Seljuk wars
Year of birth unknown